Kingwood Historic District is a national historic district located at Kingwood, Preston County, West Virginia. The district encompasses 103 contributing buildings in the central business district and surrounding residential areas of Kingswood.  Most of the buildings are two story, frame and masonry buildings.  Notable buildings include the Preston County Courthouse (1934), Kingswood National Bank Building (1908), C.M. Bishop House (1872), Preston Academy (1842), IOOF Lodge (c. 1860), Bank of Kingswood (1900), Bishop Block (1877), Presbyterian Church (1878), Methodist Church (1879), Wilson Building (1930), and Loar's Service Station (1927).  Located in the district and listed separately is the James Clark McGrew House.

Architects whose work is represented in the district include Stanton M. Howard of Wheeling for his Methodist Church, Milburn, Heister & Company of Washington, DC for their Bank of Kingwood Building, Carl Reger of Morgantown's Preston County Jail, and Richard M. Bates, Jr. of Huntington, who designed the former Central Preston High School.

It was listed on the National Register of Historic Places in 1994.

References

National Register of Historic Places in Preston County, West Virginia
Historic districts in Preston County, West Virginia
Buildings and structures in Preston County, West Virginia
Victorian architecture in West Virginia
Historic districts on the National Register of Historic Places in West Virginia